Aerial modern dance is a subgenre of modern dance first recognized in the United States in the 1970s. The choreography incorporates an apparatus that is often attached to the ceiling, allowing performers to explore space in three dimensions. The ability to incorporate vertical, as well as horizontal movement paths, allows for innovations in choreography and movement.

Overview
There are two types of aerial dance. In vertical dance a dancer is suspended in a harness from a rope or cable and explores the difference in gravity, weightlessness and varied movement possibilities offered by the suspended state. In the second type a dancer or acrobat intertwines the use of the floor or a wall with their aerial apparatus. The first utilizes the strength and expression of dance with an altered state to communicate contemporary ideas. In the second, the dancer uses dance as a way to indicate that their work is less trick-based than circus arts, and in some cases hopes that disassociating with the circus makes their work appear more contemporary and artistic.

One of the first choreographers to utilize what we now think of as aerial dance was Trisha Brown. She called her dances (1968–1971) "equipment pieces". Please see the video of a reproduction of one of her early pieces. They are not “dancey” pieces, but by placing the pedestrians on the side wall, Brown illustrates the choreography of everyday movement. She was notably the first choreographer to pull dancers up into the air. She choreographed multiple pieces off the ground, some involving projection and multimedia, using air and wall surfaces in novel ways.

In the late '90s an Argentinian aerial dance troupe named De La Guarda gained notoriety in London for their show combining performance art with aerial dance. The troupe is no longer touring, but some previous members have started a new company called Cuerda Producciones that continues to create aerial dance theater pieces.

Wanda Moretti of Italy is creating a vertical dance network aimed at collecting knowledge for artists and professionals in the field. Moretti says, “From its beginning 30 years ago, vertical dance evolved from the multiple practices and influences of its initial instigators. It was born from the desire to explore space, environment and become a place where everything was possible.”

Aerial modern pieces, whether solo or ensemble, often involve partnering. The apparatus used has its own motion, which changes the way a dancer must move in response. The introduction of a new element changes the dancer’s balance, center, and orientation in space. Aerial modern dancers gather annually for workshops in Boulder, Colorado, County Donegal in Ireland, Brittany, in France, and Italy.

Another early influence on aerial modern dance, Terry Sendgraff, is credited with inventing the "motivity" trapeze. Sendgraff actively performed, choreographed and taught in the San Francisco Bay Area from the early 1970s, until announcing her retirement in 2005 at the age of 70, when she handed over her aerial dance business to Cherie Carson. The motivity trapeze came about as a result of an exploration on a low-hung circus trapeze. The ropes twisted together, causing the apparatus to spin. By formalizing this, hooking both ropes to a single point of attachment, Ms. Sendgraff used the apparatus to spin, twist, as well as fly in a straight line and in a circle.

Workshops 
In Boulder, Frequent Flyers Productions produces the Aerial Dance Festival which been held every year since its inception in July 1999. Here workshops, performances, and discussions bring together dancers, gymnasts, circus artin Brighton, England every summer.

In Italy, an emerging aerial dance company, brought the contemporary dance discipline to a vertical stage. The performance of the Company is distinguished from others by the details of the choreography and the harmony of the movement, typical elements of classic dance. Aerial dance is an art form that is incredibly demanding and requires a high degree of strength, power, flexibility, courage, and grace to practice.

Site dance

Other examples of aerial modern dance are the site-specific works of Joanna Haigood of the Zaccho Dance Theatre, Amelia Rudolph of "Project Bandaloop," and Sally Jacques' Blue Lapis Light. Haigood’s work is based on careful research of the history, architecture and societal impact of found spaces, and the translation of these memories into the movements performed in that space. Project Bandaloop combines rock-climbing with dance in performances that scale and/or descend canyons, rock walls, and tall buildings across the world. Video of their outdoor work is sometimes integrated into indoor performances, projected onto screens or trampolines behind the dancers on stage. Blue Lapis Light uses multiple apparatuses, such as aerial silks, harnesses, and bungees to create dances on bridges, office buildings, hotels, and other outdoor spaces.

See also 

 Aerial silk
 Modern dance

References

Further reading 
 Kloetzel, Melanie and Carolyn Pavlik, editors. Site Dance: Choreographers and the Lure of Alternative Spaces; University Press of Florida; 2009.
 Bernasconi, Jayne. "Low-Flying Air Craft: a report from the Aerial Dance Festival 2000 and a talk with Terry Sendgraff". Contact Quarterly. 26.2 (2001): 19–24.
Davies, Jenefer. "Aerial Dance: A Guide to Dance with Rope and Harness". Routledge Press, 2017.
 Felciano, Rita. "AXIS: Dancing with and without wheels". Dance Magazine 76.3 (2002): 58–61.
 Haithcox, Kiran. "Learning to Dance on Air". Dance Magazine 76.3 (2002): 51–52.
 Howard, Rachel. "Terry Sendgraff". Dance Magazine 79.8 (2005): 60.
 Kreiter, Jo. "The Soul Needs the Body: the body and technology from a dancer’s perspective". Contact Quarterly. 26.2 (2001): 15–18.
 Sanderson, Marcia. "Flying Women". Dance Magazine 76.3 (2002): 46-51.
 Strom, Cat. "Tours: Hanging by a Thread: De La Guarda’s 'Villa Villa' Bounces into Sydney's Big Top". Entertainment Design: The Art and Technology of Show Business 38.9 (2004): 10-11.
 Bernasconi, Jayne C. and Smith, Nancy E. "Aerial Dance". Human Kinetics, 2008.

External links
 Croft, Clare. "Flying into the Unknown". The DanceView Times, Washington, D.C. edition 1.9: November 24, 2003
 Cycropia Aerial Dance, History.
 Forbord, Austin & Trott, Shelley. "Artists in Exile: A Storyof Modern Dance in San Francisco" (2000)
 Eagly, Ursula. "Dancing Outside the Box". Creative Capital

Contemporary dance
Modern dance
Dances